Neochlamisus bebbianae is a species in the leaf beetle genus Neochlamisus.

References

Cryptocephalinae
Beetles described in 1943